SV Gmunden is a football club that currently plays in the 5th tier Austrian 2. Landesliga .

Football clubs in Austria